Lady Liberty may refer to:
 Liberty (personification), female personification of Liberty
 Statue of Liberty (Liberty Enlightening the World), a colossal statue in New York harbor sculpted by Frédéric Auguste Bartholdi
 Lady Liberty (comics), a set of characters in the DC Comics Universe
 Lady Liberty (film), La mortadella, 1972 French-Italian comedy
 Lady Liberty (tree), an ancient bald cypress tree in Big Tree Park, Longwood, Florida
 Lady Liberty Hong Kong, statue created during the 2019 Hong Kong protests
 Mariam al-Mansouri or Lady Liberty, UAE fighter pilot
 "Lady Liberty", a rewrite of the song "Lady Lynda" by Al Jardine and Ron Altbach for The Beach Boys

See also

 Goddess of Liberty (disambiguation)
 Statue of Liberty (disambiguation)
 Liberty (disambiguation)